X is the tenth studio album by American rock band Nonpoint. It was released on August 24, 2018. It was produced by Fred Archambault, and released through Spinefarm Records. It was the last to feature lead guitarist BC Kochmit, who left Nonpoint in 2019.

Background 
Prior to recording X, the ensemble took a one year hiatus from music. In June 2018, the band published "Chaos and Earthquakes" as well as "Dodge Your Destiny". The video for "Chaos and Earthquakes" was shown in early August 2018, followed by a United States tour with He Is Legend and Letters from the Fire to promote the album.

Critical reception 
Regarding lead song "Empty Batteries", Ray Van Horn of Blabbermouth.net states, "Though the track offers little new other than the usual melodic proto core NONPOINT have long served to its fans, there's urgency to the strumming and the song's dense projection. Even the breakdown flexes with a pump instead of merely bridging."

Joe DiVita of Loudwire states that '"Dodge Your Destiny" leans further into the rock direction than the more rap-addled "Chaos and Earthquakes", though both songs are guitar-centric.  The former hinges on clobbering chugs and quick-strike drum fills while the former moves freely against a steady beat and circular guitar melodies.'

Jedd Beaudoin of Popmatters describes "Chaos and Earthquakes" as "a state of the personal union, a call to perseverance despite knowing that you stand on the precipice of utter destruction".

Trent Cornell of Overdrive Music Magazine went on to say that '"Fix This" is more ballad-like compared to what we’ve heard thus far, building from a hushed, clean verse towards one of the band’s catchiest choruses yet'.

Track listing

Chart positions 

 US Digital albums – No.13
 US Hard Rock – No.17
 Top Album Sales – No.28

Singles

References

Nonpoint albums
2018 albums